Bruce Rohde (born 31 January 1950) is  a former Australian rules footballer who played with Footscray in the Victorian Football League (VFL).

Football
Recruited from the Morwell Football Club — he played representative football for the Latrobe Valley — he played VFL football with Footscray, and, in 1974, he was captain-coach of the Brisbane-based Western Districts Australian Football Club.

He was a member of the Queensland representative team in 1974 and in 1975 (when he was vice-captain of the team).

See also
 1974 Minor States Carnival

Notes

References

External links 
		

Living people
1950 births
Australian rules footballers from Victoria (Australia)
Western Bulldogs players
Morwell Football Club players